Surveillance abuse is the use of surveillance methods or technology to monitor the activity of an individual or group of individuals in a way which violates the social norms or laws of a society.

During the FBI's COINTELPRO operations, there was widespread surveillance abuse which targeted political dissidents, primarily people from the political left and civil rights movement.

Other abuses include "LOVEINT" which refers to the practice of secret service employees using their extensive monitoring capabilities to spy on their love interest or spouse.

There is no prevention in the amount of unauthorized data collected on individuals and this leads to cases where cameras are installed inappropriately. “For instance, according to the BBC, four council workers in Liverpool used a street CCTV pan-tilt-zoom camera to spy on a woman in her apartment.” (Cavallaro, 2007). This is just one case where culprits have been caught; however, there are still many common acts such as this. Another incident of inappropriate installation now has “Pennsylvania parents suing their son's school, alleging it watched him through his laptop's webcam while he was at home and unaware he was being observed.” (Surveillance Camera Players, 2010). This leads to the misconception of surveillance, as it once was a tool to monitor and make sure citizens abide by the law, it has now created even more problems. With cameras only becoming more advanced and more common, it is difficult to determine whether these surveillance cameras are helping to ensure a safe society or leading to bigger issues altogether.

With the growing of Web 2.0 and social networking sites, surveillance may be more easily and commonly abused in many situations for a variety of reasons. For example, the Communications Security Establishment (CSE), formerly known as Communications Security Establishment Canada (CSEC), has previously spied on Canadians through the public wireless internet connections in an airport in the country. Through this they gathered information on who people called or texted and where they were when they communicated with others. The CSE search through approximately 10-15 million downloads daily. An example of where surveillance may have been abused is where Facebook and Apple have admitted to allowing government officials to access personal information of their account users.

A device which may be used to abuse surveillance, called a Stingray, acts and looks similar to a cellphone tower but it tricks mobile devices into connecting with it. After connected an operator can take information stored on the device, sometimes intercepting phone calls and text messages. This method of surveillance can be used on random civilians or in an investigation of a particular person.

See also
COINTELPRO
Secret police
Communist Stasi (Ministry for State Security/State Security Service)
 Nazi Gestapo (Secret State Police)
The Lives of Others (2006) (film)
Enemy of the State (1998) (film)
Mass surveillance
Police misconduct
Police state
Political repression
Qihoo 360 IP-Camera shutdown
Religious Police
Stalking
Category:Surveillance scandals

References

 Davis, James Kirkpatrick. (1997). Assault on the Left: The FBI and the Sixties Antiwar Movement. Westport, CT: Praeger.
 Donner, Frank J. (1980). The Age of Surveillance: The Aims and Methods of America’s Political Intelligence System. New York: Alfred A. Knopf.
 Donner, Frank J. (1990). Protectors of Privilege: Red Squads and Police Repression in Urban America. Berkeley: University of California Press. 
 Fijnaut, Cyrille and Gary T. Marx. (1995). Under Cover: Police Surveillance in Comparative Perspective. The Hague: Kluwer Law International.
 Marx, Gary T. (1988).Under Cover: Police Surveillance in America. Berkeley: Twentieth Century Fund/University of California Press. 
 Ney York Civil Liberties Union. (2006). Who's Watching
 O'Reilly, Kenneth. (1988). "Racial Matters:" The FBI's Secret File on Black America, 1960—1972. New York: Free Press.
 Staples, William G. (2000). Everyday Surveillance: Vigilance and Visibility in Postmodern Life. Lanham, MD: Rowman & Littlefield.
 Cavallaro, Andrea. (March 2007). Privacy in Video Surveillance. IEEE Xplore - Signal Processing Magazine. Retrieved from http://ssli.ee.washington.edu/courses/ee299/hws/hw4_files/privacy.pd. Retrieved May 3, 2013.
 Surveillance Camera Players (2010, April 12). Abuse of Surveillance Cameras. Retrieved from http://www.notbored.org/camera-abuses.html. Retrieved May 3, 2013.
 Alexander, Julia. "How the Canadian Government Can Spy on Your Online Activities." Toronto Sun. N.p., 8 July 2013. Web. 28 Oct. 2015.
 Braga, Matthew. "The Covert Cellphone Tracking Tech the RCMP and CSIS Won't Talk about." The Globe and Mail. N.p., 15 Sept. 2014. Web. 28 Oct. 2015.
 Brown, Jesse. "Where Is Canada's Rage over Digital Surveillance?" The Star. N.p., 1 May 2014. Web. 28 Oct. 2015.
 Hildebrandt, Amber, Dave Seglins, and Michael Pereira. "CSE Monitors Millions of Canadian Emails to Government." CBC News Canada. N.p., 25 Feb. 2015. Web. 28 Oct. 2015.
 Lievrouw, Leah A. Alternative and Activist New Media. Cambridge, UK: Polity, 2011. Print.

Law enforcement
Human rights abuses